Pit Pony is a children's historical novel written by Joyce Barkhouse.  It was published in 1990 and won the first Ann Connor Brimer Award. Pit Pony was adapted for television in 1997 and 1999.

Plot summary
In Pit Pony, Barkhouse describes life in a coal-mining town in turn-of-the-century Cape Breton and also deals with the importance of education.  It is the story of Willie and Gem, a pit pony.  Willie is an eleven-year-old boy forced by family circumstances to work as a trapper in a Cape Breton coal mine, and Gem is a Sable Island mare working as a pit pony.  As they work together, a strong bond develops between boy and horse.

The book describes the grim realities of life for a young miner – cold, exhaustion, fear – discomforts and dangers that also affected the horses.  When Willie and Gem are trapped in the mine during a "bump" – with falling rock and timber, and choking dust – Willie must choose between escaping with Gem or saving the life of another young miner.  Willie's choice to save the young miner's life over Gem's life sets Willie free – free to leave the mines and to pursue his education.  As it turns out, however, Gem had been pregnant, and her foal is saved.

Awards
Pit Pony was named as notable by the Canadian Library Association; received the first Ann Connor Brimer Award in 1991 for "outstanding contribution to children's literature in Atlantic Canada"; and was the unanimous choice of Nova Scotia librarians to be produced as a Talking Book for the CNIB, for national and international distribution.

Movie and television series
Pit Pony was made into a CBC-TV movie by Cochran Entertainment (1997), won three Gemini Awards, and became a 44-episode TV series.

References

1990 Canadian novels
Canadian children's novels
Children's historical novels
Canadian historical novels
Novels set in Nova Scotia
Cape Breton Island
Novels about horses
Children's novels about animals
1990 children's books